Gunahon Ka Devta may refer to:

Gunahon Ka Devta (novel) (1949), by Dharmveer Bharti (Hindi: गुनाहों का देवता, English: The Deity of the Sins)
Gunahon Ka Devta (1967 film), produced and directed by Devi Sharma
Gunahon Ka Devta (1990 film), directed by Kawal Sharma
Gunahon Ka Devta (TV series), an Indian television series that aired on Imagine TV from September 2010